Godfrey I (1060 – 25 January 1139), called the Bearded, the Courageous, or the Great, was the Landgrave of Brabant, Count of Brussels and Leuven (Louvain) from 1095 to his death and Duke of Lower Lorraine from 1106 to 1129. He was also Margrave of Antwerp from 1106 to his death.

Biography
Godfrey was the son of Henry II (c. 1020–1078) and Adela of Orthen (or Betuwe), a daughter of Count Everard of Orthen. He succeeded his brother Henry III who died wounded in a tournament in 1095, and only had young daughters. His widow Gertrude married Theodoric II, Duke of (upper) Lorraine.

He first came into conflict with Otbert, Bishop of Liège, over the county of Brunengeruz that both claimed. In 1099, Emperor Henry IV allotted the county to the bishop, who entrusted it to Albert III, Count of Namur. Godfrey arbitrated a dispute between Henry III of Luxembourg and Arnold I, Count of Loon, over the appointment of the abbot of Sint-Truiden.

Godfrey was in favour with the emperor and defended his interests in Lorraine. In 1102, he stopped Robert II of Flanders "the Crusader", who was invading the Cambraisis. After the death of the emperor in 1106, his son and successor, Henry V, who had been in rebellion, decided to avenge himself on his father's partisans. Duke Henry of Lower Lorraine was imprisoned and his duchy confiscated and given to Godfrey. After Henry escaped from prison, he tried to retake his duchy and captured Aachen, but ultimately failed.

In 1114, during a rift between the emperor and Pope Paschal II, Godfrey led a revolt in Germany. In 1118, the emperor and the duke were reconciled. In 1119, Baldwin VII of Flanders died heirless and Flanders was contested between several claimants, one of whom, William of Ypres, had married a niece of Godfrey's second wife. Godfrey supported William, but could not enforce his claim against that of Charles the Good. Also dead in that year was Otbert. Two separate men were elected to replace him and Godfrey again sided with the loser.

By marrying his daughter Adeliza to Henry I of England, who was also the father-in-law of the emperor, he greatly increased his prestige. However, Henry V died in 1125 and Godfrey supported Conrad of Hohenstaufen, the duke of Franconia, against Lothair of Supplinburg. Lothair was elected. Lothair withdrew the duchy of Lower Lorraine and granted it to Waleran of Limburg (c. 1085 – 1139), the son of Henry, whom Henry V had deprived in 1106. Nonetheless, Godfrey maintained the margraviate of Antwerp and retained the ducal title (which would in 1183 become Duke of Brabant).

After the assassination of Charles the Good in 1127, the Flemish succession was again in dispute. William Clito prevailed, but was soon fraught with revolts. Godfrey intervened on behalf of Theodoric of Alsace, who prevailed against Clito. Godfrey continued to war against Liège and Namur.

Godfrey spent his last years in the abbey of Affligem. He died of old age on 25 January 1139 and was buried in the left aisle of the abbey church. He is sometimes said to have passed in 1140, but this is an error.

Family and children
He married Ida of Chiny (1078–1117), daughter of Otto II, Count of Chiny, (c. 1065 – after 1131) and Adelaide of Namur.  They had several children:

 Adeliza of Louvain (b. 1103 – d. abbey of Affligem, 23 April 1151) married Henry I, King of England and later William d'Aubigny, 1st Earl of Arundel (1109 – before 1151).
 Godfrey II of Louvain (b. 1107 – d. 13 June 1142), Duke of Lower Lotharingia (Lower Lorraine), Landgrave of Brabant, Count of Brussels and Louvain. He married Lutgardis of Sulzbach (d.a. 1163), daughter of Berenger I of Sulzbach.
 Clarissa (d. 1140).
 Henry (d. in the abbey of Affligem, 1141), monk.
 Ida (d. 1162) married to Arnold I, Count of Cleves (d. 1147).

Later, he married Clementia of Burgundy (c. 1078 – c. 1133), daughter of William I, Count of Burgundy, and widow of Robert II, Count of Flanders. They had no children.

By an unknown mistress he had one son:

Joscelin of Louvain, married Agnes De Percy and had issue.

See also
Dukes of Brabant family tree
Chronique des Ducs de Brabant, Adrian van Baerland, Antwerp (1612).

References

Notes

Sources
Collins's Peerage of England, ed. S.E. Brydges IX vols, London 1812.
Académie royale de Belgique, Biographie Nationale, v. 7, Brussels, 1883.

|-

Dukes of Lower Lorraine
Counts of Louvain
Margraves of Antwerp
1060s births
1139 deaths
Year of birth uncertain
House of Reginar